Agabus arcticus is a species of predaceous diving beetle in the family Dytiscidae. It is found in North America and the Palearctic.

Subspecies
These three subspecies belong to the species Agabus arcticus:
 Agabus arcticus alpinus (Motschulsky, 1860)
 Agabus arcticus arcticus (Paykull, 1798)
 Agabus arcticus ochoticus Poppius, 1908

References

Further reading

 
 

Agabus (beetle)
Articles created by Qbugbot
Beetles described in 1798